Guy I may refer to:

 Guy I of Albon (c. 1000–1070)
 Guy I of Clermont (c. 1255 – 1302), Marshal of France, Seigneur (Lord) of Offemont
 Guy I, Count of Blois (died 1342)
 Guy I of Gibelet, of the Embriaco family
 Guy I of Luxembourg, Count of Ligny (1340–1371)
 Guy I of Montlhéry (died 1095) 
 Guy I of Ponthieu (died 1100) 
 Guy I de la Roche (1205–1263), Duke of Athens
 Guy I of Spoleto (died 860)

Other
 Guy #1, a character in We Like Sportz by The Lonely Island